Richard Vaughan (born 16 April 1978) is a Welsh and British badminton player from Llanbradach, Caerphilly, Wales. Vaughan was the Chief Executive of Badminton Ireland between 2011 - 2015 and led a noticeable growth in the sport both in terms of participation, media attention and high-performance with Olympians Scott Evans, Chloe Magee, Sam Magee, and the establishment of top world juniors in Jonathan Dolan, Nhat Ngyuen, and Paul Reynolds.

In 2014 Richard joined the board of Badminton Europe (a member of the Badminton World Federation) and Chairs the high-performance commission, which has overseen the development of a World Training Centre in Denmark.

Between 2015-2020 Richard was the CEO of Squash Australia, where he re-galvanised the sport rebranding, topping the medal table at the 2018 Gold Coast Commonwealth Games with two gold medals and a bronze medal. At the 2019 WSF World Championships, Australia won three gold medals and nine overall. A new National Training Centre was opened on the Gold Coast in late 2018, which has been the pinnacle for this high-performance success. In this period, Australia hosted two WSF World Doubles Championships and WSF World Coaches Conference. 
In 2019 Richard established the 'Friends of Squash' Parliament competition with the current Sports Minister Anika Wells and Prime Minister Anthony Albanese.

In late 2020 Richard joined the board at Equestrian Australia as a Non-Executive Director, Chairing the Finance Committee.

Richard has an MBA from Leicester University and; MA in Sports Development from Bath University, having previously achieved a BSc(Hons) in Economics and Politics. 
Richard is a Graduate of the Institute of Company Directors (GAICD) and has completed the Melbourne Business Schools Organisational Leadership Executive development course.
He is currently researching a Ph.D. study at the University of Canberra via a Sports Integrity Australia scholarship focusing on the athlete's Sports Integrity experience.
Richard has a long interest in athlete's impact on the integrity of sport, demonstrated by his stance on Darfur in the build-up to Beijing 2008.

Career
Richard Vaughan won a bronze medal at the 2000 European Badminton Championships, losing to Peter Gade (Denmark) in the semi-final. He also won a bronze medal at the 2002 Commonwealth Games, beating world No3 Susilo (Singapore) and Gupta (India) on the way to the semi-final, where he lost to Lee (Malaysia). His highest world ranking was number 7 (2002). 
Richard beat the World No1 Roslin Hashim (Malaysia) at the Danish Open 2001 and Swiss Open 2002.
In 2004 Richard beat the World Champion Xia Xuanze (China) at the All England Super Series.
Richard has 97 caps representing Wales (March 2009). 
In 2005 he established the Richard Vaughan Badminton Academy, based in the UK, helping establish many British and European players.

Summer Olympics
Vaughan has competed twice in badminton at the Summer Olympics.

2000 Summer Olympics
Vaughan played badminton at the 2000 Summer Olympics in men's singles, beating world No5 Boonsak Ponsana of Thailand in the first round and Swedish No1 Rasmus Wengberg of Sweden in the 2nd round, before losing to World No1 and World Champion Sun Jun of China, 13–15 13–15.

2004 Summer Olympics
He also competed at the 2004 Summer Olympics despite contracting a virus similar to glandular fever, which seriously impaired his preparation for the Athens Olympics. In men's singles, he defeated Marco Vasconcelos of Portugal in the first round. In the round of 16, Vaughan was defeated by Shon Seung-Mo of Korea, the eventual silver medalist.

Best Grand Prix results
Last 16 All England 2001, 2002, 2004, 2007
1/4 Final Danish Grand Prix 2001
1/4 Final Swiss Grand Prix 2002
1/4 Final German Grand Prix 2002
Semi Final Dutch Grand Prix 2000
Semi Final US Grand Prix 2007
Final Polish Grand Prix 2000
Final Polish Grand Prix 2001

Achievements

Commonwealth Games 
Men's singles

European Championships
Men's singles

European Junior Championships
Boys' singles

World Grand Prix
The World Badminton Grand Prix sanctioned by International Badminton Federation (IBF) since 1983.

Men's singles

BWF International Challenge/Series
Men's singles

Mixed doubles

 BWF International Challenge tournament
 BWF International Series tournament

References

External links
Richard Vaughan Badminton Professional Official Site

1978 births
Living people
Welsh male badminton players
Badminton players at the 2000 Summer Olympics
Badminton players at the 2004 Summer Olympics
Olympic badminton players of Great Britain
Commonwealth Games bronze medallists for Wales
People educated at Lewis School, Pengam
Commonwealth Games medallists in badminton
Badminton players at the 2006 Commonwealth Games
Badminton players at the 2002 Commonwealth Games
Badminton players at the 1998 Commonwealth Games
Medallists at the 2002 Commonwealth Games